Dr. YSR Aarogyasri (previously known as Aarogyasri) is an upgradation of Andhra Pradesh's government healthcare scheme Aarogyasri which was launched by the late chief minister Y. S. Rajasekhara Reddy in 2007. The scheme has been revamped into Dr. YSR Aarogyasri by chief minister Y. S. Jagan Mohan Reddy in January, 2020 upgrading the scheme by adding new benefits to it.

The Scheme 
Aarogyasri Scheme is the flagship scheme of all health initiatives of the state government to provide quality healthcare to the poor. The scheme benefits the holders of Dr. YSR Aarogyasri Cards with the annual income less than 5 lakh rupees where the government bears the entire medical expense once the hospital bill crosses ₹1000.

During the COVID-19 pandemic in India, the state government has also brought COVID-19 treatment under Dr.YSR Aarogyasri scheme.

Enrollment 
Households with an annual income less than ₹5 Lakh and people with less than 35 acres of land(both dry and wet land) are considered to be eligible to avail the scheme. Around 16,37,230 Aarogyasri cards were distributed to the beneficiaries.

Extent of cover 
Dr. YSR Aarogyasri is subjected to cover the entire medical expenses of all the cardholders once the hospital bill exceeds ₹1000 covering 2059 diseases.

History
Aarogyasri  (Rajiv Aarogyasri) was a  flagship healthcare program, introduced by Dr Y S Rajasekhar Reddy as Chief Minister of Andhra Pradesh before the AP Re-organisation. The aim of the Government was to achieve "Health for All". After split of state in 2014, into Telangana and Andhra Pradesh, Aarogyasri became flagship healthcare scheme of Govt of Telangana and was administered by the Aarogyasri Health Care Trust under the chairmanship of the Chief Minister. The government issued an Aarogyasri card and the beneficiary could use it at government and private hospitals to obtain services free of cost. The trust was administered by a chief executive officer, an IAS Officer. The trust ran the scheme, in consultation with specialists in the field of healthcare.

The Government of Andhra Pradesh renamed the scheme in 2019 to Dr.YSR Aarogyasri. It covers those below the poverty line families as enumerated and photographed in White Ration Card linked with Aadhaar card and available in Civil Supplies Department database. The scheme provided coverage for the services to the beneficiaries up to Rs.2.50 lakh per family per annum now Rs.5 lakh as declared by Andra Pradesh CM Mr Jagan Mohan Reddy at WORLD ECONOMIC FORUM on 23/05/2022. There was no co-payment under this scheme.

References

External links 
 Official site
 Former Aarogyasri site
 Employee Health Scheme, Andhra Pradesh
 Aarogyasri Healthcare Trust, Andhra Pradesh
 Telangana Hospitals list

Health programmes in India
Government welfare schemes in Andhra Pradesh
Health insurance in India